Tankus the Henge are a British band based in London. Initially based around the songwriting of Jaz Delorean, the band has developed a style of music which they term "gonzo rock 'n' roll", with influences from New Orleans jazz, psychedelic rock, 1970s funk and songwriters such as Tom Waits and The Band. They are lyrically and aesthetically inspired by 20th century American literature such as the works of Allen Ginsberg, Jack Kerouac, Charles Bukowski and Hunter S. Thompson, which they combine with influences from Delorean's family heritage of working on funfairs and in the circus around the UK (1950s and 1960s rock 'n' roll, brightly painted artwork, carnival lights).

The band was a PRS for Music featured artist in 2010, and in 2011 was named by Metro as one of their "Top 10 Acts To See" at Glastonbury Festival. In 2012, the group appeared on an album commemorating the 2012 London Olympics. Since then, they have become firm favourites during the European festival season, playing at Montreux Jazz Festival, Glastonbury, Isle of Wight, Fusion Festival, WOMAD and hundreds of others. Tankus the Henge have a formidable reputation for both the frequency and intensity of their live performances, and are near-permanently on tour across Europe. They were the first British band to tour in the EU since Brexit, and during the COVID-19 pandemic.

The band released their third album, titled Luna Park!, on 4 December 2020.

Releases

References

External links

 Official site
 Spotify
 

Musical groups from London